Ken Dreyfuss (born October 8, 1947) is an American coxswain. He captained and coxed the 1969 Penn heavyweight crew that broke Harvard's six year winning streak and went on to win three consecutive team championships at the Intercollegiate Rowing Association National Championships. He competed in the men's coxed pair event at the 1975 World Rowing Championships, the 1975 Pan-American Games (in which he won a gold medal), and the 1976 Summer Olympics.

Coaching career
Dreyfuss has coached at Chestnut Hill Academy, The United States Naval Academy (Plebe Heavyweights), Stanford University (Varsity Men), Potomac Boat Club, Georgetown University (Lightweight Men), Montgomery Boat Club, and currently at Annapolis Junior Rowing Association.

Dreyfuss' Chestnut Hill crew won both Philadelphia City Championships and the Stotesbury Cup. His Plebe Heavyweight crew at Navy won the 1982 Eastern Sprints. During his tenure, the Navy Heavyweight Men won the event overall in 1982, 1983, and 1984. While at Stanford University, Dreyfuss was named 1986 PAC 10 Coach of The Year. The Stanford Varsity Men defeated rivals University of California six times and the University of Washington three times. This ended a seventeen year drought against both institutions. in 1993, Dreyfuss founded the Elite Sculling program at Potomac Boat Club, which has produced more athletes invited to the United States National Team than any other program. Ken Dreyfuss currently serves as Head Coach of Annapolis Junior Rowing Association.

References

External links
 

1947 births
Living people
American male rowers
Olympic rowers of the United States
Rowers at the 1976 Summer Olympics
Sportspeople from Washington, D.C.
University of Pennsylvania alumni
Rowing coaches
Pan American Games medalists in rowing
Pan American Games gold medalists for the United States
Rowers at the 1975 Pan American Games
Medalists at the 1975 Pan American Games